is a Japanese football player.

Club statistics
Updated to 23 February 2016.

References

External links

Profile at Ehime FC

1993 births
Living people
Association football people from Ehime Prefecture
Japanese footballers
J2 League players
J3 League players
Ehime FC players
J.League U-22 Selection players
Association football midfielders